is  the Head coach of the Utsunomiya Brex in the Japanese B.League. He played college basketball for Takushoku University. He was selected by the Saitama Broncos with the second overall pick in the 2005 bj League draft.

Career statistics 

|-
| align="left" | 2005-13
| align="left" | Saitama/Tochigi
| 260 || || 16.6|| .398 || .370 || .636 || 1.5 || 1.5 || 0.6 || 0.0 ||  4.2
|-

Head coaching record

|- 
| style="text-align:left;"|Tochigi
| style="text-align:left;"|2017-18
| 47||30||17|||| style="text-align:center;"|4th in Eastern|||2||0||2||
| style="text-align:center;"|Lost in 1st round
|-
| style="text-align:left;"|Tochigi
| style="text-align:left;"|2018-19
| 60||49||11|||| style="text-align:center;"|2nd in Eastern|||4||2||2||
| style="text-align:center;"|Lost in 2nd round
|-
| style="text-align:left;"|Utsunomiya
| style="text-align:left;"|2019-20
| 40||31||9|||| style="text-align:center;"|2nd in Eastern|||-||-||-||
| style="text-align:center;"|-
|-

Personal life
Anzai has been married to Mari Konno, a former basketball player..

References

1980 births
Living people
Utsunomiya Brex coaches
Utsunomiya Brex players
Japanese basketball coaches
Otsuka Corporation Alphas players
Saitama Broncos players